Portugal competed at the 2022 World Aquatics Championships in Budapest, Hungary from 18 June to 3 July.

Artistic swimming 

Portugal entered 10 artistic swimmers.

Women

Open water swimming

Portugal entered 4 open water swimmers (2 male and 2 female )

Men

Women

Mixed

Swimming

Portugal entered 2 swimmers.
Men

Women

References

Nations at the 2022 World Aquatics Championships
2022
World Aquatics Championships